Novolaspa (Urum: Йаны Ласпи) is a village in Boykivske Raion (district) in Donetsk Oblast of eastern Ukraine, at 75.2 km SSE from the centre of Donetsk city.

During the War in Donbass, that started in 2014, the village was taken under control of pro-Russian forces.

Demographics
Native language as of the Ukrainian Census of 2001:
Ukrainian 1.58%
Russian 98.42%

References

External links
 Weather forecast for Novolaspa

Villages in Kalmiuske Raion